Tissa Reginald Balalle  (born 15 July 1937) is the eighth Governor of the North Western Province of Sri Lanka, He was in office from 2007 to 2015. He also worked as a member of parliament of sri lanka in 1970-1977.

References

Living people
Governors of North Western Province, Sri Lanka
Sri Lankan Buddhists
Sinhalese politicians
Sri Lanka Freedom Party politicians
Members of the 7th Parliament of Ceylon

1937 births